is a Japanese footballer currently playing as a centre back for Vissel Kobe.

Career statistics

Club
.

Notes

References

External links

1997 births
Living people
People from Amagasaki
Sportspeople from Hyōgo Prefecture
Association football people from Hyōgo Prefecture
University of Tsukuba alumni
Japanese footballers
Japan youth international footballers
Association football defenders
Vissel Kobe players
J1 League players